Radcliffe was a semi-professional rugby league club based in Radcliffe, a town within the Metropolitan Borough of Bury, in Greater Manchester, England.

The club joined the Northern Union in 1901–02 and played for the single season in the Lancashire Senior Competition, which was effectively Division 2 (West).

History 

The club had been founded in 1875 as Radcliffe Close Wesleyan FC. In 1896 the club joined the Northern Union playing in the Lancashire Second Competition . The club played in the inaugural Challenge Cup competition losing 3–0 away to Wigan in the first round. The following year they entered the second Challenge Cup competition and lost again in the first round, this time away to Hull F.C. at the Boulevard by 19 points to nil.

At the end of the 1900–01 season the club was promoted to the Lancashire Senior Competition but finished bottom on the competition and were not elected to the new second division of the Northern Rugby League at which time the club left the Northern Union.

Club league record 
In the single season in which Radcliffe played semi-professional rugby league, 1901–02, the team only managed two wins and a draw out of 24 games played.

Heading Abbreviations
RL = Single Division; Pl = Games played; W = Win; D = Draw; L = Lose; PF = Points for; PA = Points against; Diff = Points difference (+ or -); Pts = League points
League points: for win = 2; for draw = 1; for loss = 0.

See also 
British rugby league system
Rugby league county leagues
List of defunct rugby league clubs

References

External links 
1896–97 Northern Rugby Football Union season at wigan.rlfans.com
Hull&Proud Fixtures & Results 1896/1897
Widnes Vikings - One team, one passion Season In Review - 1896-97 
Saints Heritage Society

Defunct rugby league teams in England
Sport in the Metropolitan Borough of Bury
Radcliffe, Greater Manchester
Rugby league teams in Greater Manchester
English rugby league teams
1901 establishments in England
1902 disestablishments in England
Rugby clubs established in 1901